Thomas Hunt FRS (18 September 1696 – 31 October 1774) was an English academic, who was Laudian Professor of Arabic at the University of Oxford from 1738 until his death.

Life
Hunt was born in Horsington, Somerset and, after being educated locally, studied at the University of Oxford as a member of Christ Church, Oxford (matriculating in 1715 and obtaining his Bachelor of Arts degree in 1718). He was a tutor at Hart Hall, Oxford from 1718, and was ordained deacon in 1720 and priest in 1721.  Ecclesiastical appointments that he held were rector of Chelwood, Somerset (1721); prebend of Whitelackington, Somerset (1726); chaplain to Thomas Parker, 1st Earl of Macclesfield and tutor to his grandsons (1728); rector of Bix, Oxfordshire (1729); and rector of Shirburn, Oxfordshire (1731).  He became Laudian Professor of Arabic in 1738, additionally becoming Lord Almoner's Professor of Arabic in 1740 (the year in which he was elected a Fellow of the Royal Society) and Regius Professor of Hebrew in 1747; he gave up the Lord Almoner's chair when taking up the Regius Professorship.  He published extensively on Arabic and Hebrew matters, and was a well-regarded scholar who encouraged others.  He died on 31 October 1774 and was buried in Christ Church Cathedral, Oxford, where he held a canonry by virtue of the Regius Professorship.

References

1696 births
1774 deaths
Fellows of the Royal Society
18th-century English Anglican priests
Alumni of Christ Church, Oxford
Burials at Christ Church Cathedral, Oxford
Laudian Professors of Arabic
Lord Almoner's Professors of Arabic (University of Oxford)
Regius Professors of Hebrew (University of Oxford)